Frank Anthony Gatins (March 6, 1871 – November 8, 1911) was an American third baseman and shortstop in Major League Baseball. Born in Johnstown, Pennsylvania, he appeared in 17 games for the Washington Senators in the 1898 season and 50 games for the Brooklyn Superbas in 1901 and 1902.

External links

1871 births
1911 deaths
Major League Baseball third basemen
19th-century baseball players
Washington Senators (1891–1899) players
Brooklyn Superbas players
Baseball players from Pennsylvania
Sportspeople from Johnstown, Pennsylvania
Williamsport Demorest Bicycle Boys players
Lockhaven Maroons players
Shamokin Reds players
Toronto Canucks players
Hamilton Hams players
Hartford Indians players
Wooden Nutmegs players
Milwaukee Creams players
Newark Sailors players
New Orleans Pelicans (baseball) players
Troy Trojans (minor league) players